Pholiota microspora, commonly known as Pholiota nameko or simply , is a small, amber-brown mushroom with a slightly gelatinous coating that is used as an ingredient in miso soup and nabemono. In some countries this mushroom is available in kit form and can be grown at home. It is one of Japan's most popular cultivated mushrooms, tastes slightly nutty and is often used in stir-fries. They are also sold dried.Nameko is a cold triggered mushroom that typically fruits in the fall months when the temperature drops below 10°C for the first time, and flushes twice a few weeks apart.

In Mandarin Chinese the mushroom is known as 滑子蘑; (Pinyin: huá zi mó) or 滑菇; (Pinyin: huá gū).

In Russia it is also consumed widely, and is known as (often sold as) "opyonok" (опёнок) or plural "opyata" (опята).

In America the mushroom is sometimes called a "butterscotch mushroom".

See also
List of Pholiota species
Touch Detective, a video game featuring Japanese character Nameko

References

Fungi described in 1929
Japanese cuisine
Strophariaceae
Fungi in cultivation
Fungi of Japan
Fungi of China
Russian cuisine